Bashtin Rural District is a rural district (dehestan) in Bashtin District, Davarzan County, Razavi Khorasan Province, Iran. At the 2006 census, (including villages split off to form Mehr Rural District) its population was 5,424, in 1,684 families; excluding those villages, its population was (as of 2006) 4,127, in 1,327 families.  The rural district has 11 villages (down from 14 as of 2006).

References 

Rural Districts of Razavi Khorasan Province
Davarzan County